Tinne Eva Caroline Vilhelmson-Silfvén (born 12 July 1967 in Stockholm, Sweden) is a Swedish horse rider. Representing Sweden, she competed at seven Summer Olympics (1992, 1996, 2000, 2004, 2008, 2012 and 2016). She placed 4th in team dressage in 1992, and
in team dressage in Beijing in 2008. Meanwhile, her current best individual Olympic placement is 8th place from 2016 Olympics.

Tinne also competed at six World Equestrian Games (in 1994, 2002, 2006, 2010, 2014 and 2018) and at eleven European Dressage Championships (in 1993, 1995, 2001, 2005, 2007, 2009, 2011, 2013, 2015 and 2017). She has won three bronze medals in team competitions at European championships, in 2003, 2007 and 2017.

She also competed at seven editions for Dressage World Cup finals (in 2004, 2010, 2012, 2013, 2014, 2016 and 2019). In 2013 and 2014 she narrowly missed the podium finish and placed 4th. At the 2016 finals held in Göteborg, Sweden, Tinne finished in a runner-up position, narrowly behind Hans Peter Minderhoud of the Netherlands.

References

External links

Sportspeople from Stockholm
Swedish dressage riders
Equestrians at the 1992 Summer Olympics
Equestrians at the 1996 Summer Olympics
Equestrians at the 2000 Summer Olympics
Equestrians at the 2004 Summer Olympics
Equestrians at the 2008 Summer Olympics
Equestrians at the 2012 Summer Olympics
Equestrians at the 2016 Summer Olympics
Olympic equestrians of Sweden
Swedish female equestrians
1967 births
Living people